Dihydroquinidine (also called hydroquinidine) is an organic compound, a cinchona alkaloid closely related to quinine. The specific rotation is +226° in ethanol at 2 g/100 ml. A derivative of this molecule is used as chiral ligand in the AD-mix for Sharpless dihydroxylation.

The substance is also a class Ia antiarrhythmic medication.

See also 
 Dihydroquinine

References 

Secondary alcohols
Phenol ethers
Quinolines
Quinuclidine alkaloids